Senator Slaughter may refer to:

Daniel F. Slaughter (1799–1882), Virginia State Senate
Gabriel Slaughter (1767–1830), Kentucky State Senate